Tuscan Star was the name of a number of ships.

  for steamships
  for motor vessels

Ship names